Ballydesmond, formerly Kingwilliamstown, is a rural village in County Cork, Ireland. It lies on the Blackwater River (near its source in Menganine) on the Cork-Kerry border. The Ballydesmond quarry is an area of geological interest, containing the best example of tundra forest polygons found in Ireland. It is located at the junction of the R577 and R578 regional roads.

History
Ballydesmond was established in the 1830s as a model village, and named Kingwilliamstown after King William IV of the United Kingdom. It had formerly been known as Tooreenkeogh. In 1951, it was officially renamed Ballydesmond, an anglicisation of the Irish name Baile Deasumhan. This is thought to refer to legendary rebel, the 15th Earl of Desmond, who is believed to have taken refuge in the nearby hills. However, Kingwilliamstown remained the official name of the townland.

Daniel Buckley, Hannah Riordan and Bridget Delia Bradley from Ballydesmond survived the sinking of the RMS Titanic.

The Tureengarriffe ambush occurred near Ballydesmond, where a number of British army officers were killed during the Irish War of Independence by untrained members of the local flying column of the Irish Republican Army. Nora Herlihy, a founder member of the Irish League of Credit Unions, is from Ballydesmond.

Local economy
Ballydesmond's local economy is based around a number of small businesses. Bob's Bar, which was opened until the late 1990s, was re-opened in 2006, with a restaurant and take-away opened later on. Ballydesmond is also home to a large employer in the Cork-Kerry region, construction materials company, Munster Joinery.

Transport
The village is located on what was formerly the main Cork–Tralee road.

Education
There are two primary schools in the parish. Ballydesmond National School sits beside the local church, overlooking the village. Foilogohig National School, or "Foyle" as it is locally known, used to operate in North Ballydesmond, catering for students who live a long distance from the village. There is also a crèche in Ballydesmond. Foilogohig N.S closed at the end of the 2008–2009 school year as there was insufficient numbers for the school to remain open. Ballydesmond N.S. got an internal refurbishment in 2010.

Culture

Ballydesmond lies in the Sliabh Luachra area which is famed for its traditional Irish music and culture. There is the Sliabh Luachra Bar (John D's) in the village.

See also
 List of towns and villages in Ireland
 Ballydesmond GAA

References

External links
Ballydesmond website
Ballydesmond GAA Official website

Towns and villages in County Cork
Geology of Ireland